Mount Mathias is a  mountain summit located within Olympic National Park in Jefferson County of Washington state. Its nearest higher neighbor is Mount Olympus,  to the east. Mount Mathias is wedged between the massive Blue Glacier below its west slope, and the Hoh Glacier on the east side. Precipitation runoff from the mountain drains into the Hoh River.

History

This mountain was originally named "Apollo", for one of the Olympian deities in Greek and Roman mythology who made Mount Olympus home. It was renamed in honor of Francis Wayland "Matt" Mathias (1884–1959), a mountaineer, naturalist, and Grays Harbor County civic leader. The Mathias name was officially adopted in 1960 by the U.S. Board on Geographic Names.

The first ascent of this peak was made in 1957 by Yves Eriksson and Jim Hawkins.

Climate

Based on the Köppen climate classification, Mount Mathias is located in the marine west coast climate zone of western North America. Most weather fronts originate in the Pacific Ocean, and travel northeast toward the Olympic Mountains. As fronts approach, they are forced upward by the peaks of the Olympic Range, causing them to drop their moisture in the form of rain or snowfall (Orographic lift). As a result, the Olympics experience high precipitation, especially during the winter months. During winter months, weather is usually cloudy, but due to high pressure systems over the Pacific Ocean that intensify during summer months, there is often little or no cloud cover during the summer. The months July through September offer the most favorable weather for viewing or climbing this peak.

Geology

The Olympic Mountains are composed of obducted clastic wedge material and oceanic crust, primarily Eocene sandstone, turbidite, and basaltic oceanic crust. The mountains were sculpted during the Pleistocene era by erosion and glaciers advancing and retreating multiple times.

See also

 Olympic Mountains
 Geology of the Pacific Northwest

References

External links
 
 Weather forecast: Mount Mathias

Olympic Mountains
Mountains of Washington (state)
Mountains of Jefferson County, Washington
Landforms of Olympic National Park
North American 2000 m summits